The COVID-19 pandemic in Laos is part of the worldwide pandemic of coronavirus disease 2019 caused by severe acute respiratory syndrome coronavirus 2. On 24 March 2020, Laos became the last country in Southeast Asia to report its confirmed case of the virus. As of 05 June 2022, there were a total of 210,081 cases and 756 deaths. On 4 May 2021, Laos exceeded 1,000 cases of COVID-19. Five days later, the country recorded the first death.

On 21 December 2021, Laos overtook China in terms of the number of confirmed COVID-19 cases.

Background 
On 12 January 2020, the World Health Organization (WHO) confirmed that a novel coronavirus was the cause of a respiratory illness in a cluster of people in Wuhan City, Hubei Province, China, which was reported to the WHO on 31 December 2019.

The case fatality ratio for COVID-19 has been much lower than SARS of 2003, but the transmission has been significantly greater, with a significant total death toll.

Timeline

2020

March
On 13 March, provincial authorities closed some of border posts.

On 24 March, Laos confirmed its first two COVID-19 cases, becoming the last Southeast Asian country infected with coronavirus.

On 26 March, the Vientiane Times confirmed the country's third COVID-19 case.

On 27 March, there were six cases confirmed. Two more men from Luang Prabang, and one from Vientiane.

On 28 March, there were 2 more confirmed, bringing a total to 8.

On 30 March, there was 1 more confirmed, bringing everything to a total of 9.

April
On 1 April, one more case was confirmed, bringing a total to 10.

On 5 April 2020, the 11th case was reported as a 55-year-old man from Papua New Guinea.

The government announced a lockdown on 29, March, starting on 30 March. All land borders closed and the last flights departed from Luang Prabang and Vientiane occurred on 1 April.

May
By May 18, more restrictions had been loosened, allowing domestic travel, without foreign travellers allowed.

June
On 2 June, students returned to classrooms.

On 4 June, the government allowed foreign travellers into the country.

July to December 
On 25 July, one new case was confirmed. It was a South Korean national.

2,621 people were isolated over concerns.

2021

March 
A second wave of vaccinations occurred.

May 
On the morning of 9 May, Laos recorded the first death due to COVID-19. The Embassy of Vietnam in Vientiane confirmed that was a Vietnamese woman died after one week of treatment.

Statistics 

 Confirmed new cases per day 

 Confirmed deaths per day 

 Confirmed cases March - July 2020

Assistance

The Laotian Times says China sent medical experts, medical equipment and medicines, to help Laos fight COVID-19.

On 27 March, Vietnam offers help by sending medical equipment worth .

On 4 May 2021, Vietnam's Deputy Minister of Health Nguyen Truong Son and 32 experts departed for Laos to set up field hospitals, increase emergency resuscitation and strengthen testing capacity.

Censorship
Some people have been arrested for allegedly spreading false information about the COVID-19 pandemic.

References

External links
 CoronaTracker – Statistics on the coronavirus cases in Laos
 Coronavirus COVID-19 Global Cases and historical data by Johns Hopkins University
 Laos Travel Restrictions – Laos Travel Restrictions: How COVID-19 Affects Visitors

 
coronavirus pandemic
coronavirus pandemic
Laos
Laos
Disease outbreaks in Laos